Sainte-Eulalie (Auvergnat: Santa Alària) is a commune in the Cantal department in south-central France.

Geography
The Maronne river flows through the middle of the commune.

Population

See also
Communes of the Cantal department

References

Communes of Cantal
Cantal communes articles needing translation from French Wikipedia